South Carolina Highway 79 (SC 79) is a  primary state highway in the U.S. state of South Carolina. It connects communities in western Marlboro County.

Route description
SC 79 is a two-lane rural highway, traversing from SC 9 to the North Carolina state line where the road continues in Gibson, North Carolina as North Carolina Highway 79.

History
Originally established in 1937 as a new primary route, it connected U.S. Route 78 (US 78) in Denmark, to Voorhees College. In 1938, it was replaced by SC 68, which later became a secondary road by 1948.

The current SC 79 was established in 1938 as a renumbering of part of SC 38, from Bennettsville to the North Carolina state line. Between 1967 and 1970, SC 79 was rerouted and replaced SC 383 to SC 9; the old alignment became SC 385.

South Carolina Highway 383

South Carolina Highway 383 (SC 383) was a state highway that was established by 1937 as new primary routing from SC 9 near Bennettsville to SC 79 near Boykin. It was renumbered as part of SC 79 by 1970.

Major intersections

See also

References

External links

079
Transportation in Marlboro County, South Carolina